Centrocoris variegatus is a species of family Coreidae, subfamily Coreinae.

A distinctive character of Centrocoris variegatus in respect of Centrocoris spiniger are shorter antennae.

It is found in most of Europe.

References

External links 
 BioLib
 Fauna Europaea
 EOL

Coreini
Hemiptera of Europe
Taxa named by Friedrich August Rudolph Kolenati
Insects described in 1845